Strandmøllen (literally "The Beach Mill") is a former paper mill located at the mouth of the Mølleåen river in the Øresund coast north of Copenhagen, Denmark.

History

The first watermill at the site was built as a paper mill in the 16th century and was later used as a fulling mill. The mill was owned by the Drewsen family between 1718 and 1889 and was operated as a paper mill with great success by Johan Christian Drewsen, Christian Drewsen and Michael Drewsen.

Niels Sigfred Nebelong designed a residence for the Drewsen family which was completed in 1850. The house was frequented by many leading Danish literary figures of the day. In 1889, Strandmøllen merged with several other paper mills under the name De Forenede Paperfabrikker ("United Paper Mills"). The company decommissioned the Strandmøllen complex in 1898. Most of the industrial complex was demolished in 1918 but immediately thereafter restored by the architect Carl Brummer. In 1920–21, Christian Nielsen established a production of hydrogen and oxygen at Strandmøllen. The company, A/S Strandmøllen, has been owned by a foundation since 1967 and is still based at the site.

In popular culture
 Hans Christian Andersen's 1949 fairytale The Shirt-Collar was inspired by Strandmøllen.

References

External links
 A/S Strandmøllen

Buildings and structures in Rudersdal Municipality
Watermills in Denmark
Industrial buildings in Copenhagen
Pulp and paper mills